The Coupe de France féminine (Women's French Cup) is the top annual cup tournament for French women's football clubs. The competition is open to all professional and non-professional women's teams in France. Founded in 2001 as Challenge de France, the competition was renamed as Coupe de France féminine from the 2011–12 season.

Lyon holds the record for most titles overall, having won nine times. The defending champions are Paris Saint-Germain, who defeated Yzeure on 15 May 2022.

History 
The inaugural Challenge de France was first held during the 2001–02 season. The competition coincided with the inaugural edition of the UEFA Women's Cup, which is now known as the UEFA Women's Champions League. The cup competition is the only tournament in France reserved for senior women's players. Participation in the competition varies. Regional clubs participation is voluntary, however, clubs who participate in D3 Féminine on up participation is mandatory unless unforeseen circumstances prohibit their appearance. 

Olympique Lyonnais are the most successful club in the competition, holding nine titles.

List of finals
The following is a list of Coupe de France féminine seasons and final results.

Performance by club

References

External links
Official site 
Cup at soccerway.com

 
Fra
Women's football competitions in France
Football cup competitions in France